La Selva Beach (La Selva, Spanish for "The Forest") is a census-designated place (CDP) in Santa Cruz County, California. The 2020 United States census reported La Selva Beach's population was 2,531.

La Selva Beach is one of the several small communities located in and around Aptos. It neighbors Seascape to the north, Corralitos to the east, and Watsonville to the south. When founded, the small beach community was surrounded by dense conifer woods.

Geography
La Selva Beach lies near the San Andreas Fault, and was close to the epicenter of the October 17, 1989 Loma Prieta earthquake.

According to the United States Census Bureau, the CDP covers an area of 5.3 square miles (13.7 km2), all of it land.

History
In 1925 it was founded as Rob Roy by real estate developer David Batchelor.  The now-defunct (since 2000) Rob Roy Video Store was the only business in the area to make note of this heritage. In 1935 the name was changed to La Selva Beach by the new developer, Edward Burghard. Most of the existing houses were built in the early 1960s. In the 1970s the residents convinced state government to remove "Beach" from the direction signs. Officially the name is still La Selva Beach.

Demographics

The 2010 United States Census reported that La Selva Beach had a population of 2,843. The racial makeup of La Selva Beach was 2,399 (84.4%) White, 27 (0.9%) African American, 23 (0.8%) Native American, 116 (4.1%) Asian, 3 (0.1%) Pacific Islander, 146 (5.1%) from other races, and 129 (4.5%) from two or more races. Hispanic or Latino of any race were 372 persons (13.1%).

The Census reported that 2,592 people (91.2% of the population) lived in households, 245 (8.6%) lived in non-institutionalized group quarters, and 6 (0.2%) were institutionalized.

There were 1,076 households, out of which 289 (26.9%) had children under the age of 18 living in them, 592 (55.0%) were opposite-sex married couples living together, 86 (8.0%) had a female householder with no husband present, 56 (5.2%) had a male householder with no wife present.  There were 67 (6.2%) unmarried opposite-sex partnerships, and 13 (1.2%) same-sex married couples or partnerships. 251 households (23.3%) were made up of individuals, and 91 (8.5%) had someone living alone who was 65 years of age or older. The average household size was 2.41.  There were 734 families (68.2% of all households); the average family size was 2.80.

The population was spread out, with 612 people (21.5%) under the age of 18, 228 people (8.0%) aged 18 to 24, 528 people (18.6%) aged 25 to 44, 1,049 people (36.9%) aged 45 to 64, and 426 people (15.0%) who were 65 years of age or older.  The median age was 46.5 years. For every 100 females, there were 98.5 males.  For every 100 females age 18 and over, there were 96.4 males.

The homeowner vacancy rate was 0.4%; the rental vacancy rate was 5.7%.  1,723 people (60.6% of the population) lived in owner-occupied housing units and 869 people (30.6%) lived in rental housing units.

Parks and recreation
La Selva Beach is adjacent to Manresa State Beach where one can fish, surf, and boogie board.  These breaks are not as popular as others in Santa Cruz County.  La Selva Beach does have direct public access and public parking is available near by.

The central park of La Selva Beach is Triangle Park.  The park is triangular in form and enhanced by a triangular structure with the flags of the world.   There is also a horseshoe pit.

In the summer, one can witness children practicing their baton-twirling/hurling skills and building floats, while their parents practice library push-cart choreography in preparation for the La Selva Beach 4th of July Parade.  This parade is shorter but less known than the so-called "World's Shortest Parade" which takes place concurrently in Aptos, California.

Education
Rio del Mar Elementary school and the Monterey Bay Academy are the nearest educational institutions.
The Aptos Academy was a private school in the area from 1999 through June 2013.

Notable residents
 Aaron Bates, professional baseball player.
 Don Bunce, Star Rose Bowl quarterback and orthopedic surgeon.
 Jason Jessee, professional skateboarder.

References

Census-designated places in Santa Cruz County, California
Populated coastal places in California
Census-designated places in California